Hood's Minstrels were an amateur Texas-based blackface Confederate military band, of the Texas Brigade, during the American Civil War, who began performing in a log cabin theater that they built themselves in 1862; they performed in it alongside a choir and a brass band. They were the most popular group of their kind during the War. Members included Mollie and Gus Bailey.

References

Notes

American military bands
Cultural history of the American Civil War
Texas Brigade